Dinarabad may refer to:
Dinarabad, Hamadan
Dinarabad, Lorestan
Dinarabad, Markazi
Dinarabad, Tehran
Dinarabad, Shahriar, Tehran